The Sawyer Building is a historic commercial building at 4-6 Portland Street in Dover, New Hampshire.  The three-story brick structure was built in 1825, during Dover's period of economic prosperity following the establishment of its textile mills.  It is one of Dover's oldest commercial buildings.  The building was listed on the National Register of Historic Places in 1980.

Description and history
The Sawyer Building occupies a prominent triangular lot bounded by Portland Avenue and Main Street in downtown Dover, and is also known locally as the Flatiron Building, after the triangular Flatiron Building in New York City.  It is three stories in height, built out of brick set on a granite foundation.  Its street-facing facade is curved at the street corner, and extends for a total of seventeen bays, five of which have entrances.  The entrances are framed in granite, and windows have granite lintels.  It is covered by a low-pitch hipped roof.

The building was erected in 1825, during Dover's early boom period as a cotton textile manufacturing center.  Its location, known then as the Landing, was the commercial trading hub for the city's maritime cotton trade, which was one of the most extensive in the country in 1830.  It is one of Dover's oldest surviving commercial buildings, and an excellent example of commercial Federal period architecture.

See also
National Register of Historic Places listings in Strafford County, New Hampshire

References

Commercial buildings on the National Register of Historic Places in New Hampshire
Federal architecture in New Hampshire
Buildings and structures completed in 1812
Buildings and structures in Dover, New Hampshire
National Register of Historic Places in Strafford County, New Hampshire